The Cambrian Heritage Railways is a heritage railway company, trust and society based at both Llynclys and Oswestry in its newly restored Oswestry railway station, Shropshire, England.

Formed after the 2009 merger of the Cambrian Railways Society and the Cambrian Railways Trust, it aims to reinstate the infrastructure required to operate trains from Gobowen to Llynclys Junction (for Pant) and to Blodwel.

Cambrian Heritage Railways also operates the Cambrian Railways Museum in the Oswestry railway station's former goods depot. Displays include photographs, signs, lamps, signal box fittings and artefacts related to the history of the Cambrian Railways.

Cambrian Railways

Beginning in 1864, the Cambrian Railways was formed through the merger of a series of regional railway companies on the England/Wales border. Following LNWR sponsored connection with the LNWR station at Gobowen, it enabled CR and LNWR trains to run from the northwest and North Wales into Mid Wales and beyond. This enabled the LNWR to have an alternative route to the GWR mainline, enabling it to run trains between the coal and steel industries of South Wales, into the industrialised Midlands and Northwest England.

Merged into the GWR on grouping, it closed its old Oswestry station and ran all services from the former CR/LNWR station. Initially on nationalisation in 1946 it became part of the Western Region of British Railways, but in 1963 moved to the London Midland Region. This brought about a sharp decline in services, with the final DMU-powered passenger service running in 1968. Occasional quarry trains ran until 1988 to Blodwel, after which the track was left in place but abandoned by Network Rail.

National identity
All operations of the Cambrian Heritage Railways are located within England, albeit close to the Welsh border. However, the historical Cambrian Railways company operated from the Welsh/English border territory into Wales, with more than 95% of its permanent way located in Wales. A number of currently operational Welsh heritage railways were also part of the historical Cambrian Railways, or linked to it, including the Vale of Rheidol Railway, the Welshpool and Llanfair Railway, the Ffestiniog Railway, the Welsh Highland Heritage Railway and the partially preserved Penmaenpool railway station. Cambrian Heritage Railways are widely publicised throughout Wales and despite their English location, are preserving elements of significant English and Welsh railway heritage.

History
In 1972, a group of enthusiasts established the Cambrian Railways Society (CRS), which obtained a lease from BR over the former Oswestry goods yard and Oswestry South Signalbox. The CRS established a museum in the former CR goods shed and acquired either directly, or through members, a number of steam and diesel engines plus associated rolling stock. The CRS then purchased the freehold of Weston Wharf goods yard and shed with the help of the Heritage Lottery Fund. After quarry trains finished in 1988, the CRS obtained further agreement from BR to run occasional works/inspection trains (i.e. non-passenger carrying, non-revenue earning) over the line to Blodwel.

In 1998, to secure the trackbed and return trains to the residual CR lines, a wider community group of the CRS, Oswestry Council and local business people formed the Cambrian Railways Trust (CRT), to acquire the railway between Gobowen and Blodwel. Once secured, the CRT would hand over the legal agreement to the CRS to actually run trains. In 1997, the CRT obtained funding to carry out a business study of the plans and subsequently agreed to purchase the track from Railtrack. By 2001, planning permission had been obtained for the entire project, along with a supporting business plan and funding.

However, after government-owned company Network Rail replaced Railtrack, they stopped negotiations and broke off the deal, stating that they would only deal with a local council. As a result, the CRS withdrew from the CRT and went back to new direct negotiations with Network Rail. After negotiations failed for a second time, the CRS established a third base on part of the Nantmawr branch at Llanddu Junction.

The enthusiasts left in CRT decided to embark on their own project, having been offered the freehold of the trackbed between Llynclys and Pant. After obtaining European Union grant aid through Oswestry Borough Council’s tourism initiative, the trackbed was purchased by the council and leased to the CRT. From 2003/4, the CRT began rebuilding the track bed, which allowed trains to run from July 2005. Further grants from DEFRA and the EU allowed this small operation to expand, in both track as well as rolling stock assets. This culminated in the building of Llynclys South station.

In 2005, the council bought the semi-derelict Oswestry railway station, refurbishing it with grant aid to provide both a visitor and small business centre. It established the Oswestry Station Building Trust to manage the building and provide information on the old CR. Also in 2005 the CRT obtained via match-funding an HLF grant to establish a new business plan to reinstate the railway between Gobowen, Llynclys and Blodwel.

After completion of the study, the CRT proposed a merger with the CRS and the Oswestry Station Building Trust. This would enable: the assets of all three organisations to be merged; duplication of effort in restoring the railway to be removed; a revenue stream which would enable such efforts to continue; and a resultant organisation capable of obtaining monies to restore the railway at an earlier date. This was agreed to in 2009, resulting in the formation of the new trust company, Cambrian Heritage Railways.

Through a ballot at an Extraordinary General Meeting held at Oswestry railway station on 20 November 2009, members of both the CRS and CRT agreed that:
Every member of the CRS & CRT automatically becomes a member of the recently formed Cambrian Heritage Railways (CHR) Ltd
The CRT & CRS work towards transferring assets from the CRT to CHR Ltd.; and
Various functions of both groups be combined to avoid duplication of costs and efforts.

Operations
The CHR currently operates trains on a short stretch of line in Oswestry and on the former CRT Llynclys South to Pant line. The CHR has moved the museum collections of the CRS into Oswestry station, while retaining the former goods shed as an engine and rolling stock restoration point. CHR is also restoring more of the railway infrastructure in Oswestry to operational condition, and since 2006 has restored the former Oswestry South Signal Box, thanks to a £22,000 grant from the Oswestry Visitor Facilities Infrastructure fund.

The first steam passenger services ran on the CHR on 24 August 2007, with a DMU trailer coach worked by ex-Hams Hall Peckett No. 1738/1928 on loan for two weekends from the Kingfisher Line. It was the first steam locomotive at Llynclys since the closure of the Oswestry-Welshpool section of the Cambrian in 1964.

Extension developments

The Cambrian Heritage Railway is extending and repairing track from Llynclys South northwards towards Oswestry to enable trains to run into the former Cambrian Railway headquarters at Oswestry. The line between Llynclys Junction and the A483 level crossing at Weston on the Oswestry bypass was largely cleared and was visited by HM Railways Inspectorate in September 2009 with recommendations made.

Additional working-party activities have concentrated on the eastern edge of Dolgoch housing estate between Porth-y-waen and Llynclys and the A483 road bridge at Llynclys. Efforts are soon expected to be directed from the Dolgoch housing estate west towards Blodwel, which will link up with an already cleared section at Porth-y-waen.

Recent work has concentrated on reinstating track from the current railhead south of Oswestry station, aimed at reaching Weston Wharf, the location of a craft brewery and other recreational facilities. Before this extension was realised, work was required prior to track being re-laid: the replacement of the Middleton Road Footbridge; lowering of the trackbed under Gasworks Bridge; and the replacement of the Cattle Creep girders beyond Travis Perkins.

By December 2018, ballast was laid from the current railhead to Gasworks Bridge and from the Cattle Creep north to near the bridleway crossing at Travis Perkins. Concrete sleepers were laid from the railhead to where the sewer passes under the track, at which point steel sleepers were laid. Concrete sleepers had also been laid for about 200m north from the Cattle Creep. Work progressed, using mechanical help, in spacing and aligning the sleepers.

Early in 2019, a contractor fixed the rail-bearing chairs to the concrete slab under Gasworks Bridge. Work on Gasworks Bridge was completed and trains can run under it. Track has been laid at Weston Wharf after the rolling stock that was stored there had been moved. Sections for the new station at Weston Wharf were delivered and installed. The extension to Weston was completed and opened for service on 2 April 2022.

T&WA Order
The CHR applied for a Transport & Works Act Order for transfer of NR's residual rights to itself and this was granted on 28 February 2017. This permits the CHR to reopen the route from Gobowen to Blodwel Quarry subject to level crossings of the A5 and A483 being replaced by a tunnel and overbridge respectively.

Stations of the Cambrian Heritage Railways
Cambrian Railway (Oswestry)
Gobowen [Future Interchange for commuter services to the National Rail network.]

Oswestry
Weston Wharf
Llynclys North [Located at the exact site of Llynclys Junction, this will be the replacement station site to the former Llynclys station site as well as the future junction station towards Blodwel.]
Porth-Y-Waen Halt
Blodwel

Cambrian Railway (Llynclys)
Gobowen [future interchange for commuter services to the National Rail network]
Park Hall Halt
Oswestry
Weston Wharf
Llynclys South [current northern terminus]
Penygarreg Lane Halt [current southern terminus]

Locations and map

 Not Open Yet
 Closed

 Closed
 Cloesd

Locomotives
The locomotive fleet currently based on the line is listed below.Steam LocomotivesAndrew Barclay Sons & Co. 0-6-0ST "The Barclay" no. 885 of 1900. Stored awaiting restoration at Oswestry.
Peckett 0-4-0ST "Adam" no. 1430 of 1916. Stored awaiting restoration at Oswestry.
Beyer Peacock 0-4-0ST "Oliver Veltom" no. 2131 of 1951. On display in the Cambrian Railways Museum. Overhaul ongoing at Oswestry.
Andrew Barclay Sons & Co. 0-4-0ST "Henry Ellison" no. 2217 of 1947. Operational at Oswestry, arrived on loan from The Ecclesbourne Valley Railway in March 2022.
Andrew Barclay Sons & Co. 0-4-0ST "Fife Flyer No 6" no. 2261 of 1949. Out of service awaiting overhaul at Oswestry, arrived from The Ribble Steam Railway in August 2016.
Hunslet Austerity 0-6-0ST 0-6-0ST "Norma" no. 3770 of 1952. On display in the Cambrian Railways Museum. Overhaul started at Oswestry but suspended pending fundraising.Diesel LocomotivesHudswell 0-4-0DM no. D893 of 1951. On display in the Cambrian Railways Museum. Overhaul undertaken at Oswestry as time allows.
BR 0-6-0 Class 08 no. D3019 of 1953. Undergoing overhaul at Llynclys.
Vulcan 0-4-0 "Telemon" no. 295 of 1955. Operational for passenger and shunting duties at Llynclys.
Ruston & Hornsby 0-4-0DM "Scottie", works no. 412427 of 1957. Previously carried the number 1. Operational for passenger and shunting duties at Oswestry.
Planet 0-4-0 Diesel hydraulic "Alpha", works no. 3953 of 1962. Operational as a yard shunter at Oswestry.
Ruston and Hornsby 0-4-0DE "Alun Evans" no. 11517, works no. 458641 of 1963. Operational for passenger and shunting duties at Oswestry, 165 hp engine.
English Electric 0-6-0DH "Jana" no. D1201 of 1969. Stored at Llynclys.
English Electric 0-6-0DH no. D1230 of 1969. Known as 'Kimberley' by previous owners but no plates carried. Operational as a shunter and permanent way locomotive at Llynclys.
F. C. Hibberd & Co Ltd 0-4-0 "Cyril" no. 3541 of 1952. Operational. Returned to CHR Oswestry in March 2018 from Tanat Valley Light Railway, Nantmawr.Diesel Multiple UnitsBR Class 101 unit nos. 51205+54055 and 51187+51512 of 1957-1959. 51205 is undergoing overhaul, 54055 (originally 56055) is undergoing restoration, and 51187 and 51512 are both in regular service at Llynclys.
BR Class 144 unit nos. 144006 (55806+55829) and 144007 (55807+55830). 144006 is operational at Oswestry, while 144007 is stored at Weston.Electro-Diesel LocomotivesBR Class 73 "City of Winchester" no. E6036. Operational at Oswestry.Miscellaneous'
GP-TRAMM (General Purpose Track Repair and Maintenance Machine) no. 98205 of 1985. Stored at Blodwel.

Carriages
Passenger carriages are based at Llynclys, Oswestry and Weston for use, storage or future restoration to be carried out. Most of the British Rail Mark 1 variety had already seen service in preservation prior to being brought on site, as most of these vehicles were originally based at the Great Central Railway in Loughborough.

BR Mk 1 RMB 1850. Non-operational and used as a station shop and café at Llynclys.
BR Mk 1 FO 3095. Undergoing overhaul, roof repaired and repainted, exterior and interior being finished.
BR Mk 1 TSO W3950. Operational at Oswestry.
BR Mk 1 SO 4362. Stored awaiting restoration.
BR Mk 1 TSO E4610. Undergoing overhaul with the bodywork receiving attention.
BR Mk 1 TSO E4965. Operational at Oswestry.
BR Mk 3 SLE 10722. Ex-Caledonian Sleeper. Stored at Oswestry.
BR Mk 1 CK 15632. Undergoing overhaul, bodywork receiving minor repairs and roof being repainted.
BR Mk 1 CK E16025. Undergoing overhaul.
BR Mk 1 BSK 35316. In restored condition but not used.
BR Mk 1 BSK E35334. Undergoing overhaul.
BR Mk 1 BSK 35342. Stored awaiting restoration.
BR Mk 3 40751 LNER Buffet Coach. Used as a station shop and café at Weston.
BR Mk 1 43046. Stored at Llynclys.
BR Mk 1 43145. Operational at Oswestry.

In addition, there is an unrestored GWR Dean four-wheeled three-compartment Brake Third coach on display in Oswestry.

See also
Railways of Shropshire

References

External links
Cambrian Heritage Railways Trust
Old Cambrian Railways Society page – historic information
Video footage of Oswestry railway station

Heritage railways in Shropshire
Museums in Shropshire
Railway museums in England